Talmadge Layne "Tab" Thacker (March 10, 1962 – December 28, 2007)  was a former NCAA wrestler and actor.

Early life
Thacker was on the football, basketball, track, and wrestling teams while at West Forsyth High School in Clemmons, North Carolina. He won the 1980 Junior National Greco-Roman championship before enrolling at NC State.

College
In college, Thacker won the NCAA wrestling heavyweight championship in 1984. Before that he finished 6th in 1983, and 8th in 1982, making him in total a 3-time All-American. He also won four Atlantic Coast Conference titles with the Wolfpack. He finished his college career 92-11-1, ranking second in NC State history with an .889 winning percentage and 54 pins. Thacker majored in criminal justice while at NC State.

Professional career
He began his film career after Clint Eastwood noticed him in Time magazine and noted the 6-foot-4 and 450-pound (1.93 m, 204 kg) Thacker's size. Thacker went on to appear in several films including City Heat, Wildcats, two of the Police Academy films, and Identity Crisis.

After leaving Hollywood, Thacker returned to Raleigh, North Carolina, where he opened a remodeling business and operated several nightclubs. He later became a bail bondsman.

Filmography

Death
A North Carolina native, Thacker died in Raleigh, North Carolina on December 27, 2007, at the age of 45 after years of failing health. He developed diabetes and had a foot amputated some years before he died. He was buried in Evergreen Cemetery in Winston-Salem, North Carolina.

References

External links 
 
 "NCAA wrestling champ, "Police Academy" actor from N.C. dies", The Charlotte Observer, 27 December 2007
 Tab Thacker, 45; NCAA wrestler cast in films. The Los Angeles Times, 30 December 2007

American male sport wrestlers
1962 births
2007 deaths
Deaths from diabetes
American male film actors
Sportspeople from Raleigh, North Carolina
NC State Wolfpack wrestlers
20th-century American male actors